The 2014–15 Kerala Premier League Season was the second season of the Kerala Premier League, a professional football league played in Kerala since 2013–14. The Season included a Women's Edition for the first time. The season features eight teams. The season kicked off on 2 May and ended on 7 May, while the semi-finals began on 9 May, which will conclude with the final match on 11 May. The final was played between State Bank of Travancore and Kerala Police on 11 May 2015. State Bank of Travancore were crowned as champions defeating Kerala Police 5–1 in the final. Wayanad FC emerged as the winners of the Women's Edition.

Structure
It featured the best eight teams of Kerala affiliated to the KFA competing for the Trophy. The league was played in a two single format where the teams were divided into two groups of four teams each. Matches were played in Wayanad. Top two teams from each group qualified for the semifinals. Three points were awarded for a win, one for a draw and zero for a loss. At the end of the season a table of the final League standings was determined, based on the following criteria in this order: points obtained, goal difference, and goals scored.

Sponsorship
Ramco Cements were the sponsors of the league from the inaugural season(2014). Hence the league was known as Ramco Kerala Premier League

Men's

Teams
This is the completed club list for the 2014–15 season.

Group stage
Group A

Group B

Matches
Group A

Group B

Semifinal

Final

Women's

Matches
Final

References

External links
 https://www.facebook.com/KeralaFootball

Kerala Premier League seasons
4